The Volkswagen Worker range covers the 8 Tonne to 31 Tonne (GVW) category in the Volkswagen Caminhões e Ônibus range.

 17 model variants.
 9 are Electronic Engines 5 Cummins & 4 MWM all Common Rail Diesel Engined.
 8 Mechanical Engines 4 Cummins and 4 MWM.
 The majority of the Worker range has been driven on 3 Continents & 30 Countries in the Toughest Conditions e.g. South America.

Specs and range
The 1st number before . = the Gross Vehicle Weight the 2nd number = the Horsepower rating.

E= Electronic Versions

8.120 Euro III
8.150E
13.170E
13.180 Euro III
13.180E
15.170E
15.180 Euro III
15.180E
17.180 Euro III
17.220 Euro III
17.220 Euro III tractor
17.250E
24.220 Euro III
24.250E
26.220 Euro III
26.260E
31.260E

Military Version - Worker 15.210 (4x4)

Developed in collaboration with Brazilian Army the Worker is a medium truck with 4x4, tested to ensure compliance with the requirements of a typical use by the military. The worker can carry up to 5t load on any terrain, although their maximum load capacity is greater.

The vehicle is designed to carry both military and for transporting general cargo, container, water and even to allow installation of anti-aircraft weaponry.

Was fully developed and adapted in Brazil Features: Total gross weight of 15 t, MWM 6.10 TCA adopted engine, of 206 hp and torque of 657 Nm, Eaton FS5406 transmission, front axle and transfer case Marmon-Herrington MVG 750, rear axle RS 23-145 with locking differential.

References

External links

Volkswagen Worker International portal
VW de México truck site  

Worker
Trucks of Brazil